Sir John Wood, 1st Baronet DL (8 September 1857 – 28 January 1951) was a British Conservative Party politician who served as the Member of Parliament (MP) for Stalybridge from 1910 to 1918 and then for Stalybridge and Hyde from 1918–1922. He was created a baronet, of Hengrave, Suffolk, on 14 February 1918.

Educated at Rugby School and at Magdalen College, Oxford, Wood was a barrister, called to the bar at the Inner Temple in 1883. He married twice, firstly in 1883 to Estelle Benham. His second marriage was in 1892 to Gertrude Emily Bateman (died 1927), third daughter of the 3rd Baron Bateman; they had two sons and one daughter. His elder son, John Arthur Haigh, succeeded to the baronetcy, and his younger son Edmund
was MP for Stalybridge and Hyde from 1924 to 1929.

References

Sources 
https://web.archive.org/web/20070928035535/http://usenet.lineages.co.uk/article.php?id_article=2674&grp_id=1

External links 
 

1857 births
1951 deaths
Baronets in the Baronetage of the United Kingdom
Conservative Party (UK) MPs for English constituencies
Deputy Lieutenants of Herefordshire
UK MPs 1910–1918
UK MPs 1918–1922
People from Stalybridge
Members of the Inner Temple
Place of birth missing
People educated at Rugby School
Alumni of Magdalen College, Oxford
Members of the Parliament of the United Kingdom for Stalybridge and Hyde